Dixie Blur is the fourth studio album by American musician and producer Jonathan Wilson. It was released on March 6, 2020, by Bella Union.

Critical reception
Dixie Blur was met with generally favorable reviews from critics. At Metacritic, which assigns a weighted average rating out of 100 to reviews from mainstream publications, this release received an average score of 80, based on 6 reviews.

Track listing

Charts

References

2020 albums
Jonathan Wilson (musician) albums
Albums produced by Jonathan Wilson (musician)
Bella Union albums